Megaphorus clausicellus is a species of robber flies in the family Asilidae. Their preferred habitat is open sandy area.

References

Asilidae
Articles created by Qbugbot
Insects described in 1850